Klaus Gysi (3 March 1912 – 6 March 1999) was a journalist and publisher and a member of the French Resistance against the Nazis. After World War II, he became a politician in the German Democratic Republic, serving in the government as Minister of Culture from 1966 to 1973, and from 1979 to 1988, as the State Secretary for Church Affairs. He was a member of the Socialist Unity Party (SED) and after German Reunification, the Party of Democratic Socialism (PDS). His son is the German politician Gregor Gysi.

Life 

Gysi was born in Neukölln, a borough of Berlin, Germany. His father was a doctor and his mother a bookkeeper. He attended grade school and Gymnasium in Neukölln and in 1928, joined the Young Communist League of Germany, the Workers International Relief and the Sozialistischer Schülerbund. He received his Abitur from the Odenwaldschule in Darmstadt in 1931, and that same year, joined the Communist Party (KPD). From 1931 to 1935, he studied social economics in Frankfurt am Main, the Sorbonne in Paris, and in Berlin.

He became active in the left-wing students' movement in 1931 and in 1935; he was expelled from Humboldt University of Berlin. He went to  Cambridge, England in 1936 and later, to Paris, France, where in 1939, he became one of the student leaders of the Communist Party there. He was then detained in France from 1939 to 1940, afterward returning to Germany on order of the KPD, accompanied by his wife, Irene. In Berlin, Gysi worked at the publisher Hoppenstedt & Co. and was involved in underground political activities against the Third Reich.

After the war, Gysi joined the SED. From 1945 to 1948, he was the editor-in-chief of the monthly Aufbau: Kulturpolitische Monatsschrift. From 1945 to 1977, he was a member of the presidium council, the federal secretary and lastly, a member of the presidium of the Cultural Association of the GDR. From 1949 to 1954, he was a representative in the GDR's parliament, the People's Chamber. From 1952 to 1957, he worked at the publishing house Verlag Volk und Wissen, afterward succeeding Walter Janka as head of Aufbau-Verlag, working there until 1966.

In 1963, Gysi became a member of the West Commission of the Politburo of the SED's Central Committee. From January 1966 to 1973, he was the Minister for Culture, a member of the Council of Ministers of East Germany and the Culture Commission of the Central Committee's Politburo. From 1967 to March 1990, he again served as a representative in the People's Chamber.

From 1973 to 1978, Gysi was ambassador to Italy, Vatican City  and Malta. From December 1978 to 1979, he was the General Secretary of the GDR's Committee for European Security and Cooperation, which prepared for GDR's participation in the Helsinki Accords. In November 1979 Gysi succeeded Hans Seigewasser as the State Secretary for Church Affairs, remaining in this position until his retirement in 1988. After the Fall of the Berlin Wall, Gysi became a member of the PDS in 1990.

Personal 
Gysi was married three times and had seven children. His first wife, Irene (née Lessing) (1912-2007) was the sister of Gottfried Lessing, and sister-in-law of Doris Lessing. They divorced in 1958. Their daughter, Gabriele Gysi (*1946), is an actress. She moved to the former West Germany in 1985. Their son Gregor (*1948), a lawyer, was head of the PDS from 1989 to 1993 and is today one of the most prominent politicians in Germany's Left Party.

Recognition and honors 
In 1969, Gysi was awarded the Banner of Labor; in 1970, he received the Memorial Medal of the Ministerium für Staatssicherheit and the Lenin Memorial Medal. In 1972, he was awarded the Patriotic Order of Merit; in 1977, the Order of Karl Marx; and in 1982, he received the honor clasp of the Patriotic Order of Merit. In 1987, he was awarded the Star of People's Friendship and received an honorary degree from the University of Jena.

References

Further reading 
 Bernd-Rainer Barth, Helmut Müller-Enbergs: Gysi, Klaus. In: Wer war wer in der DDR? 5th edition, volume 1. Christof Links Verlag, Berlin (2010)

External links 

 

1912 births
1999 deaths
Politicians from Berlin
German people of Jewish descent
Communist Party of Germany politicians
Socialist Unity Party of Germany politicians
Party of Democratic Socialism (Germany) politicians
Government ministers of East Germany
Members of the Provisional Volkskammer
Members of the 1st Volkskammer
Members of the 5th Volkskammer
Members of the 6th Volkskammer
Members of the 7th Volkskammer
Members of the 8th Volkskammer
Members of the 9th Volkskammer
Cultural Association of the GDR members
Ambassadors of East Germany to Italy
Cold War diplomats
People of the Stasi
Communists in the German Resistance
Recipients of the Patriotic Order of Merit (honor clasp)
Recipients of the Banner of Labor
People from Neukölln